The 1965 Western Kentucky Hilltoppers football team represented Western Kentucky State College (now known as Western Kentucky University) as a member of the Ohio Valley Conference (OVC) during the 1965 NCAA College Division football season. Led by eighth-year head coach Nick Denes, the Hilltoppers compiled an overall record of 2–6–2 with a mark of 1–5–1 in conference play, for seventh place in the OVC. The team's captain was Ken Frick.

Schedule

References

Western Kentucky
Western Kentucky Hilltoppers football seasons
Western Kentucky Hilltoppers football